Granules India Limited is an Indian pharmaceutical manufacturing company based in Hyderabad, India. Granules manufactures several off-patent drugs, including Paracetamol, Ibuprofen, Metformin and Guaifenesin, on a large scale for customers in the regulated and rest of the world markets. Granules India Limited entered CRAMS segment, which focuses on contract research and manufacturing.

History
Granules India was formed in 1984 as Triton Laboratories. Triton produced Paracetamol API at its Bonthapally factory on the outskirts of Hyderabad. Triton scientists found a more efficient way to produce the Paracetamol API, which led to lower capital and raw material requirements. In 1987, Triton became the only Indian company aside from Dr. Reddy's Laboratories to export pharmaceutical products to the U.S.

Though Triton was growing as an API manufacturer, management decided it could create a value added version of its product. In order to distinguish itself from competitors, Triton management pioneered the concept of manufacturing and selling in bulk granulated Paracetamol, also known as direct compressible grade material (DC), or "PFI". In 1990, it opened its second manufacturing facility at Jeedimetla to produce multiple APIs.

In 1991, management set up a new entity, which was incorporated as Granules India Limited. Soon after Granules applied the PFI concept to other APIs, set up a PFI facility at Jeedimetla and began exporting the material to various markets including the U.S., Germany and Australia.

In 1995, Granules became a public company, after having initial public offerings on the Bombay and Hyderabad Stock Exchanges.

In 2013, Granules India acquires Auctus Pharma for Rs 120 crore.

In 2016, Granules India commissioned a new state of the art manufacturing unit that hosts facilities for Oncology and High Potent APIs. This new plant is located in Visakhapatnam.

In order to secure API for its Ibuprofen PFI, Granules formed a joint-venture with Hubei Biocause Heilen Pharmaceutical to create Granules Biocause in Wuhan, China. Granules India Limited on announced its intention to divest its entire equity shareholding in Granules Biocause Pharmaceuticals Co. Ltd. by selling its stake to joint venture partner.

Infrastructure
Granules has seven manufacturing facilities; six are in India while the seventh is through a joint-venture with Hubei Biocase in Wuhan, China. The company also has two research centres, at Hyderabad and Pune.

The Gagillapur facility is located near Hyderabad and has a Finished Dosage block, a PFI block and a research & development facility.

Granules commissioned the world's single largest PFI plant in Gagillapur in August 2003 with a batch size of 6 MT and an annual capacity of 7,200 MT per annum. The plant received its US FDA approval within six months of commissioning.

See also
Pharmaceutical industry in India

References
8. https://health.economictimes.indiatimes.com/news/pharma/granules-india-to-divest-its-stake-in-its-joint-venture-located-in-china/71596498

Pharmaceutical companies of India
Manufacturing companies based in Hyderabad, India
Pharmaceutical companies established in 1984
Indian companies established in 1984
1984 establishments in Andhra Pradesh
Companies listed on the National Stock Exchange of India
Companies listed on the Bombay Stock Exchange